Sandström is a Swedish surname. It derives from the Swedish words sand and ström which literally means Sandstream.

Notable people with the surname include (all Swedes if not noted):

Anna Sandström (1854–1929), educational reformer and feminist
Anton Sandström (b. 1981), curler
Beatrice Sandström (1910–1995), surviving passenger on board RMS Titanic in 1912
Bertil Sandström (1887–1964), horse rider 
David Sandström (b. 1975), punk rock drummer 
David Sandström (ReGenesis character)
Emil Sandström (1886–1962), lawyer and chairman of the International Federation of Red Cross and Red Crescent Societies 1950–1959
Felix Sandstormöm (b. 1997), ice hockey player
Folke Sandström (1892–1962), equestrian
Ingvar Sandström (b. 1942), cross country skier
Ivar Sandström (1889–1917), aviation pioneer
Jan Sandström (b. 1954), composer 
Jan Sandström (b. 1978), ice hockey player
Johan Sandström (1874–1947), oceanographer and meteorologist
Jörgen Sandström (b. 1971), musician 
Nils Sandström (1893–1973), athlete
Runar Sandström (1909–1985), water polo player
Sune Sandström (1939–2011), police commissioner
Sven-David Sandström (b. 1942), composer 
Tomas Sandström (b. 1964), retired hockey player 
Ulf Sandström (b. 1964), pianist
Ulf Sandström (b. 1967), retired hockey player

Swedish-language surnames